William III (30 April 1425 – 17 September 1482), called the Brave (in German Wilhelm der Tapfere), was landgrave of Thuringia (from 1445) and claimant duke of Luxemburg (from 1457).  He is actually the second William to rule Thuringia, and in Luxembourg; he was the third Margrave of Meissen named William.

He was a younger son of Frederick I the Warlike, elector of Saxony, and Catherine of Brunswick and Lunenburg. On 2 June 1446 he married Anne of Luxembourg, daughter of Albert II, King of Germany, Bohemia and Hungary and Elisabeth of Luxembourg.  On behalf of his wife, he became Duke of Luxembourg from 1457 to 1469. They had two daughters, Margaret of Thuringia (1449–1501) and Catherine of Thuringia (1453 – 10 July 1534), who married Duke Henry II of Münsterberg.

William minted a silver groschen known as the Judenkopf Groschen. Its obverse portrait shows a man with a pointed beard wearing a Jewish hat, which the populace took as depicting a typical Jew.

Ancestors 

1425 births
1482 deaths
Rulers of Thuringia
Landgraves of Thuringia
Saxon princes
House of Wettin
Medieval Knights of the Holy Sepulchre